A constitution is the highest laws of a sovereign state, a federated state, a country or other polity.

Constitution or constitutional may also refer to:

Politics, regulation, and law
Constitution (corporate), the regulations governing the affairs of a legal person
Constitution (Roman law), a legislative enactment of a Roman emperor
Apostolic constitution, a level of decree issued by a Pope
Apostolic Constitutions, a collection of Early Christian canon law
Constitution of the United States, oldest written and codified national constitution in force

Ships and vehicles
 , a schooner purchased by the British Royal Navy in 1835
 , a passenger ship, commissioned in 1951
 , the oldest commissioned warship afloat in the world
 , a battlecruiser canceled when partially complete in 1923
 Space Shuttle Enterprise or Constitution
 R6V Constitution, a US Navy aircraft built by Lockheed

Places
Constitution, Ohio, a community in the United States
Constitution Island, part of the United States Military Academy at West Point

Other uses
The Constitution (film), 2016 Croatian film
The Constitution, a former weekly newspaper in Connecticut
"Constitution", a song by Badfinger

See also

British Constitution (solitaire), a card game
Constitución (disambiguation)
Constitution theory
List of national constitutions